Hansford County is a county located in the U.S. state of Texas. As of the 2020 census, its population was 5,285. Its county seat is Spearman. The county was created in 1876 and organized in 1889. It is named for John M. Hansford, a Texas state congressman and judge.

History

Native Americans

In 1873, English brothers James Hamilton Cator and Arthur J. L. (Bob) Cator were sent by their father, British naval officer Captain John Bertie Cator, to Kansas in search of financial opportunity.  The brothers soon found their true calling as buffalo hunters and established an outpost along the North Palo Duro Creek. They named this camp Zulu, and it soon became known as Zulu Stockade.

The depletion of the buffalo herds led in part to the ongoing conflict between Indians and settlers.
The Second Battle of Adobe Walls took place in neighboring Hutchinson County in 1874 and led to the Red River War of 1874–1875. A group of buffalo hunters attempted a revitalization of Fort Adobe.  The Comanches, Cheyenne, Arapaho, and Kiowa saw the fort and the decimation of the buffalo herd as  threats to their existence. Comanche medicine man Isa-tai prophesied a victory and immunity to the white man's bullets in battle.  Quanah Parker lead several hundred in a raid on the fort.  The buffalo hunters were able to force the Indians into retreat. The Red River War of 1874-1875 was a United States Army campaign to force the removal of Indians in Texas and their relocation to reservations, to open the region to white settlers.

Establishment and growth

The Texas Legislature formed Hansford County in 1876 from Young and Bexar Counties. The county was organized in 1889. The town of Hansford
became the first county seat.

Early large ranches in Hansford County were spread in neighboring counties, as well. By 1890, only 23 ranches were in operation in the county. In November 1876, Kansan Thomas Sherman Bugbee established the Quarter Circle T Ranch.
The Scissors Ranch was begun in 1878 by William E. Anderson at the Adobe Walls site. The ranch was named after the brand, which looked like a pair of scissors. Coloradan Richard E. McNalty moved to Texas and began the Turkey Track Ranch, which he sold to Charles Wood and Jack Snider in 1881. Scotland- born James M. Coburn formed the Hansford Land and Cattle Company. The Quarter Circle T Ranch and Scissors Ranch were sold to Coburn in 1882.  Coburn acquired the Turkey Track Ranch in 1883.

In 1887, Hansford became a stage stop on the old Tascosa-Dodge City Trail.

In 1909, Anders L. Mordt began to bring in Norwegian farmers to settle the northern part of the county, centering on a rural community they named Oslo.

By 1920, 221 farms and ranches had been established in the county. The same year, the North Texas and Santa Fe Railway built into Spearman.
By 1929, Spearman became the county seat.  Chicago, Rock Island and Gulf Railway built southward in the 1920s leading to Gruver, becoming the second-largest town in the county. In 1931, the Santa Fe Railroad connected with the Rock Island, joining Morse.

The county began to be connected by highways and farm roads, from the 1920s through the 1940s.
Oil was discovered in Hansford County in 1937.  By the end of 1974,  had been extracted from county lands since 1937. By the 1980s, Hansford County had a diversified economy based on agriculture, oil, and transportation.

Geography

Major highways
  State Highway 15
  State Highway 51
  State Highway 136
  State Highway 207

Adjacent counties
 Texas County, Oklahoma (north)
 Ochiltree County (east)
 Roberts County (southeast)
 Hutchinson County (south)
 Sherman County (west)

Demographics

Note: the US Census treats Hispanic/Latino as an ethnic category. This table excludes Latinos from the racial categories and assigns them to a separate category. Hispanics/Latinos can be of any race.

As of the census of 2000,  5,369 people, 2,005 households, and 1,489 families resided in the county.  The population density was 6 people per square mile (2/km2).  The 2,329 housing units averaged 2 per square mile (1/km2).  The racial makeup of the county was 79.88% White, 0.04% African American, 0.75% Native American, 0.22% Asian, 17.47% from other races, and 1.64% from two or more races.  About 31.48% of the population was Hispanic or Latino of any race. In ancestry, 15.6% were of German, 8.4% were of English, 8.2% were of Irish, 6.0% were of American, 3.2% were of Dutch, and 2.3% were of Norwegian.

Of the 2,005 households, 36.90% had children under the age of 18 living with them, 65.00% were married couples living together, 5.90% had a female householder with no husband present, and 25.70% were not families. About 24.00% of all households were made up of individuals, and 12.40% had someone living alone who was 65 years of age or older.  The average household size was 2.63 and the average family size was 3.14.

In the county, the population was distributed as 29.30% under the age of 18, 6.80% from 18 to 24, 26.30% from 25 to 44, 22.30% from 45 to 64, and 15.20% who were 65 years of age or older.  The median age was 36 years. For every 100 females, there were 96.50 males.  For every 100 females age 18 and over, there were 96.40 males.

The median income for a household in the county was $35,438, and for a family was $40,281. Males had a median income of $29,022 versus $17,668 for females. The per capita income for the county was $17,408.  About 12.00% of families and 16.40% of the population were below the poverty line, including 22.60% of those under age 18 and 15.00% of those age 65 or over.

Communities

Cities
 Gruver
 Spearman (county seat)

Census-designated place
 Morse

Politics

See also

 Dry counties
 List of museums in the Texas Panhandle
 Recorded Texas Historic Landmarks in Hansford County

References

External links
 Hansford County government’s website
 
 Lucky Lindbergh's 1934 Landing in Hansford County Tx
 Hansford County Profile from the Texas Association of Counties

 
1889 establishments in Texas
Populated places established in 1889
Texas Panhandle
Majority-minority counties in Texas